Sher Miandad Khan (born 1968), is a Pakistani qawwal and a folk singer. He was born in Pakpattan, Pakistan and started his qawwali group in 1996. He adopted qawwali singing as his family tradition. His grandfather Din Mohammad Qawwal (Dina Qawwal) was a renowned qawwal of India and Pakistan. He learned music from his father Ustad Miandad Khan. He is a cousin of renowned qawwal Nusrat Fateh Ali Khan. Sher Miandad is the younger brother of another popular Pakistani qawwal Badar Ali Khan also known as Badar Miandad Qawwal.

Career
He has given his qawwali performances of sufiana kalam at many international music fairs and shows including in the United States, Switzerland, India and Singapore. Sher Miandad and his qawwali group has performed for Pakistan Television and Radio Pakistan. His qawwali group has performed in Geneva, Switzerland and Oslo, Norway and have won some international music awards also.

Naats 
Some of his Naats are:
 Tu Kuja Man Kuja

Qawali 
Some of his Qawalis are:
 Nach malanga
 Baba dey darbar chirryan boldiyan 
 Jugni (Sakhi Lal Di Jugni)
 Yad bhuldi nai teri
 Tumhein dillagi bhulni pare gi
 Qalandri Gharha
 Raaz diyan gallan

References 

Pakistani folk singers
Pakistani qawwali groups
Pakistani qawwali singers
Living people
1968 births
Punjabi people
Performers of Sufi music